Louis A. "Lou" Levy (March 5, 1928 – January 23, 2001) was an American jazz pianist.

Biography
Levy was born to Jewish parents in Chicago, Illinois, United States, and start to play the piano aged twelve. His chief influences were Art Tatum and Bud Powell.

A professional at age nineteen, Levy played with Georgie Auld (1947 and later), Sarah Vaughan, Chubby Jackson (1947–1948), Boyd Raeburn, Woody Herman's Second Herd (1948–1950), Tommy Dorsey (1950) and Flip Phillips. Levy left music for a few years in the early 1950s and then returned to gain a strong reputation as an accompanist to singers, working with Peggy Lee (1955–1973), Ella Fitzgerald (1957–1962), June Christy, Anita O'Day and Pinky Winters. Levy also played with Dizzy Gillespie, Shorty Rogers, Stan Getz, Terry Gibbs, Benny Goodman, Supersax and most of the major West Coast players. Levy recorded as a leader for Nocturne (1954), RCA, Jubilee, Philips, Interplay (1977), and Verve.

Levy died of a heart attack in Dana Point, California at the age of 72.

Selected discography

As leader

As sideman

References

External links

 
 
 

1928 births
2001 deaths
Cool jazz pianists
Bebop pianists
American jazz pianists
American male pianists
Jewish American musicians
Musicians from Chicago
West Coast jazz pianists
Jewish jazz musicians
20th-century American pianists
Jazz musicians from Illinois
20th-century American male musicians
American male jazz musicians
20th-century American Jews